Zonaria zonaria is a species of sea snail, a cowry, a marine gastropod mollusk in the family Cypraeidae, the cowries.

Subspecies
Zonaria zonaria gambiensis (Shaw, 1909)

Description
The shell size varies between 15mm and 47mm.

Distribution
This species is found in the Atlantic Ocean off Cape Verde, Senegal, Gabon and Angola.

References

 Bernard, P.A. (Ed.) (1984). Coquillages du Gabon [Shells of Gabon]. Pierre A. Bernard: Libreville, Gabon. 140, 75 plates pp.

Cypraeidae
Gastropods described in 1791
Taxa named by Johann Friedrich Gmelin
Molluscs of the Atlantic Ocean
Molluscs of Angola
Gastropods of Cape Verde
Invertebrates of West Africa